
Year 376 BC was a year of the pre-Julian Roman calendar. At the time, it was known as the Year of the Tribunate of Mugillanus, Lanatus, Cornelius and Praetextatus (or, less frequently, year 378 Ab urbe condita). The denomination 376 BC for this year has been used since the early medieval period, when the Anno Domini calendar era became the prevalent method in Europe for naming years.

Events 
 By place 
 Greece 
 The Athenian admiral Chabrias wins a naval victory for Athens over the Spartan fleet, off the island of Naxos (the Battle of Naxos). The battle is brought on by the Athenians to break the Spartans' blockade of Athens' corn-ships from the Black Sea.
 The Thracian city of Abdera is sacked by the Triballi.

Births 
 Olympias, wife of king Philip II of Macedon and mother of Alexander the Great (d. 316 BC)

Deaths 
 Zhou An Wang, king of the Chinese Zhou Dynasty

References